James Douglas Hamilton (born November 29, 1954) is an American econometrician currently teaching at University of California, San Diego. His work is especially influential in time series and energy economics. He received his PhD from the University of California, Berkeley in 1983.

His research spans a range of topics, including monetary policy, business cycles, energy markets, econometrics. His work has been translated into Japanese, Chinese, and Italian.

Published works
 Time Series Analysis (Princeton University Press, 1994)
 Advances in Markov-Switching Models (Physica-Verlag, 2002; Coedited with Baldev Raj)
 Risk Premia in Crude Oil Prices (Journal of International Money and Finance, 2014; Coedited with Jing Cynthia Wu)
 The Equilibrium Real Funds Rate: Past, Present and Future (IMF Economic Review, 2016); Coedited with Ethan Harris, Jan Hatzius and Kenneth West.

References
 Econbrowser blog
 Vita at UCSD (PDF)
 
 James D. Hamilton Publications List
 James D. Hamilton Information from UCSD

1954 births
Living people
Time series econometricians
Fellows of the Econometric Society
University of California, Berkeley alumni
University of California, San Diego faculty